Patania quadrimaculalis is a moth in the family Crambidae. It was described by Vincenz Kollar and Ludwig Redtenbacher in 1844. It is found in Japan, Taiwan, Bhutan, Borneo, India, Nepal, China, Korea and the Russian Far East (Amur, the Kuriles). It is also present in Equateur in the Democratic Republic of the Congo.

Adults have been recorded on wing in March.

References

Moths described in 1844
Spilomelinae
Taxa named by Vincenz Kollar